Stade Klébert Picard is a multi-purpose stadium in Le Tampon, Réunion.  It is currently used mostly for football matches and serves as the home stadium of US Stade Tamponnaise of the Réunion Premier League and CAF Champions League.

References

Football venues in Réunion
La Tamponnaise